, also known as , is an airport in Mashiki, Kumamoto, Japan.

History
The first Kumamoto Airport opened in 1960 on the site of a former Imperial Japanese Army air base and had a 1,200 m runway. It was replaced by the current Kumamoto Airport in 1971. The new airport's 2,500 m runway was extended to 3,000 m in 1980.

Kumamoto was one of three nationally owned airports to turn a profit in fiscal year 2011 (along with New Chitose Airport and Komatsu Airport). In 2013, the government passed legislation aimed at eventually allowing the sale of an operating concession at the airport.

China Airlines charter service to Kaohsiung was announced in 2014 in order to cater to packaged tours from Taiwan.

Airlines and destinations

Statistics

Gallery

References

External links

 Kumamoto Airport 
 Kumamoto Airport 

Airports in Kyushu
Transport in Kumamoto Prefecture
Buildings and structures in Kumamoto Prefecture